In the area of food and beverage marketing, an Optimized Consumer Intensity Analysis uses data from a sensory perception experiment, often in the form of a blind taste test, to compare brands or products. For example, the Pepsi Challenge is a famous taste test that has been run by Pepsi since 1975 as a method to show their superiority to Coca-Cola.

Input and output 

An OCI Analysis takes in data from a sensory perception experiment and outputs a graph showing the distribution of the products per attribute taking into account the overall liking score. Data resulting from sensory perception experiment results in (at least) the following variables:
 Product [in one experiment, multiple products are rated]
 Overall liking of the product
 Sensory intensity attributes [perceived saltiness, perceived sweetness, etc.]

The output graph shows the average sensory attribute per product. Key to the interpretation of the graph is a provided interval "the optimal range".  This interval is understood and interpreted in several ways:
 Products within this interval are optimal with respect to the attribute at hand.
 Products within that interval are not different from each other with respect to the attribute.
 Products within that interval cannot be improved by changing the attribute.
 Products outside that interval can be improved by changing the attribute.

Notes
 
 http://researchfrontiers.uark.edu/6148.php
 http://www.sciencedirect.com/science/journal/09503293

Quantitative marketing research